Ganghwa Maehwamarum Habitat is located at Choji-ri, Gilsang-myun, Ganghwa-gun, Incheon Metropolitan
city, South Korea. Maehwamarum (Ranunculus kazusensis Makino) is a plant that grows in a swamp or a lake and it is about 50 cm tall. Until the 1960s, maehwamarum was very abundant and easily seen. However, due to pollution and demolition of ponds and wetlands, it is now found only in 30 places in Korea. And one of these is Ganghwa Maehwamarum Habitat.

Significance
It is very significant that Ganghwa Maehwamarum Habitat is registered at Ramsar Wetland. Ganghwa Maehwamarum Habitat is a rice paddy which is a man-made wetlands. But despite the fact that it is man-made, it became the first rice paddy to be formally registered as a Ramsar Wetland. This became possible in the 10th Ramsar Conference which recognized the importance and the need of rice paddies in Asia. Ganghwa Maehwamarum Habitat has led other rice paddies being designated as Ramsar Wetlands.

Public conservation movement
Growth of maehwamarum, once thought extinct, was discovered on Ganghwa Island lands which were slated for redevelopment. Knowing the importance of preserving rare plants, the National Trust intervened and acquired the land. The National Trust is run by public contributions and aims to protect ecologically important areas by buying the land and protecting it from other commercial acts. Although the Maehwamarum Habitat is small compared to other wetlands, it was designated as Ramsar Wetland for continuous preservation.

Organisms

Plants
 Maehwamarum (Korean water crowfoot; Ranunculus kazusensis)
 River bulrush (Scirpus fluviatilis)

Animals
 Black-faced spoonbill
 Chinese egret
 Gold-spotted pond frog (Rana plancyi chosenica)
 Korean brown frog (Rana coreana)
 Boreal digging frog (Kaloula borealis'')
 Korean ratsnake (Elaphe schrenckii)
 Nepa hoffmanni Many kind of wolf spiders, such as Dolomedes sulfureus Horseshoe crab
 Rice paddy snails
 Water snails
 Crucian carp
 Mudfish
 Rice eel (Monopterus albus'')

Introduced
 Banded bull frog
 Largemouth bass

References

Ramsar sites in South Korea
Incheon